HMS Vestal was a turbine-powered  of the Royal Navy. She was launched in 1943 and saw service in the Pacific War against the Empire of Japan. She was critically damaged by Japanese kamikaze aircraft in 1945 and was subsequently scuttled in waters close to Thailand.

Vestal was the only British ship to be sunk by kamikaze attack and the last Royal Navy ship to be lost in the Second World War. She was sunk whilst partaking in Operation Livery. Vestal was commanded by Lt. Charles William Porter, DSC, from 26 July 1943 until 26 July 1945, when the ship was sunk. Her engine was provided by Paxman.

Design and description
The ships' complement consisted of 85 officers and ratings.

The ships had two Parsons geared steam turbines,, each driving one shaft, using steam provided by two Admiralty three-drum boilers.

The Algerine class was armed with a QF  Mk V anti-aircraft gun and four twin-gun mounts for Oerlikon 20 mm cannon. The latter guns were in short supply when the first ships were being completed and they often got a proportion of single mounts. By 1944, single-barrel Bofors 40 mm mounts began replacing the twin 20 mm mounts on a one for one basis. All of the ships were fitted for four throwers and two rails for depth charges.

Construction
The ship was laid down at the Harland and Wolff yard in Belfast on 11 January 1943. She was launched on 19 June that year and commissioned on 10 September, a build time of just seven months and three days.

Operations

1944 

Vestal underwent trials until October 1944. She took part in a minesweeping exercise around Harwich with a flotilla, which was working in the Scheldt estuary.

1945 
Vestal was deployed as a part of the East Indies Fleet, along with Pincher, Plucky, Recruit, Rifleman, and Chameleon. On 24 July, Squirrel hit a mine, which killed seven men.

Vestal was sunk on 26 July 1945 whilst participating in Operation Livery. At around 18:25, an alarm was sounded as three unidentified planes had been spotted coming over Phuket Island, and were soon followed by several more. Vestal was hit by a kamikaze, sustaining critical damage and killing twenty men. She was the last Royal Navy ship to be sunk in the Second World War. As the ship was hit close to Thailand, which was a Japanese ally, the crew were taken off and the ship was scuttled by the destroyer HMS Racehorse.

Wreck 

References

Publications
 R Chesnau, ed. (1980) Conway's All the World's Fighting Ships 1922–1946. Conway Maritime Press, Greenwich, UK

 Peter Elliott (1977) Allied Escort Ships of World War II. MacDonald & Janes, 
 H Lenton (1998) British & Empire Warships of the Second World War''. Naval Institute Press, Annapolis, Maryland

External links
HMS Vestal at uboat.net

 

1943 ships
Algerine-class minesweepers of the Royal Navy
World War II shipwrecks in the Indian Ocean
Ships built in Belfast
Ships built by Harland and Wolff
Maritime incidents in July 1945
Ships sunk by kamikaze attack
Minesweepers sunk by aircraft